This is a list of firearm cartridges which have bullets in the  caliber range.

Length refers to the cartridge case length.
OAL refers to the overall length of the cartridge.

All measurements are in mm (in).

Pistol cartridges

Revolver cartridges

Rifle cartridges

6.8 mm (.277 in) rifle cartridges (commonly known as .270 or 6.8 mm)

7.0 mm (.284 in) rifle cartridges (commonly known as 7mm)

7.8 mm (.308 in) rifle cartridges (commonly known as .308, 30 caliber, 7.62 mm)

7.87 mm (.310 in) and greater rifle cartridges

References

Barnes, Frank C., ed. Amber, John T., Cartridges Of The World (3rd Edition), (DBI, 1978),

External links
 7mm Cartridge Guide from AccurateShooter.com
 Rifle Shooter Mag article on 7 mm cartridges

Pistol and rifle cartridges